Liberty Tree Plaza is a plaza commemorating the Liberty Tree in Boston, in the U.S. state of Massachusetts.

References

External links
 

Geography of Boston
Squares in the United States